Dariusz Stanicki (born 3 January 1965) is a former Polish volleyball player, a member of Poland men's national volleyball team in 1983–1991, technic manager of Fenerbahçe Men's Volleyball and Fenerbahçe Women's Volleyball teams.

External links 
 Fenerbahçe website volleyball page

References 

1965 births
Living people
Volleyball players from Warsaw
Polish men's volleyball players
AZS Częstochowa players
Gwardia Wrocław players
Galatasaray S.K. (men's volleyball) players